Potrerillos may refer to:

 Potrerillos, Chile, a former mining camp in Atacama Region, Chile
 Potrerillos (caldera), Atacama Region, Chile
 Potrerillos, Cortés, a municipality in Honduras
 Potrerillos, El Paraíso, a municipality in Honduras
 Potrerillos, Mendoza, a touristic area in Mendoza Province, Argentina
 Boca de Potrerillos, a pre-Columbian archaeological site in the northern Mexican state of Nuevo León, known for its petroglyphs
 Potrerillos Dam, on the Mendoza River, Argentina
 Potrerillos, Chiriquí, Panama